Luciano Leonel Cuello (born May 20, 1984 in La Plata, Buenos Aires, Argentina) is an Argentine boxer in the Light Middleweight division. Luciano is the current WBC Latino Welterweight and former WBO Latino Light Middleweight Champion.

Pro career
On March 28, 2009 Cuello lost a 10 round Unanimous Decision to top Prospect, Mexican Julio Jr.

In July 2010 Luciano fought top Welterweight Contender, Canelo Álvarez. The bout was held in Vicente Fernández Arena. The Mexican fighter Álvarez beat Cuello by TKO in the sixth round.

Professional record

|- style="margin:0.5em auto; font-size:95%;"
| style="text-align:center;" colspan="8"|35 Wins (17 knockouts), 4 Losses, 0 Draw
|- style="text-align:center; margin:0.5em auto; font-size:95%; background:#e3e3e3;"
| style="border-style:none none solid solid; "|Res.
| style="border-style:none none solid solid; "|Record
| style="border-style:none none solid solid; "|Opponent
| style="border-style:none none solid solid; "|Type
| style="border-style:none none solid solid; "|Rd., Time
| style="border-style:none none solid solid; "|Date
| style="border-style:none none solid solid; "|Location
| style="border-style:none none solid solid; "|Notes
|- align=center
|Loss || 35-4 ||align=left| Julian Williams
|TKO ||1 (10) ||  || align=left|
|align=left|
|- align=center
|Win || 35-3 ||align=left| Rafael Chiruta
|UD ||8 (8) ||  || align=left|
|align=left|
|- align=center
|Win || 34-3 ||align=left| Martín Fidel Ríos
|UD ||12 (12) ||  || align=left|
|align=left|
|- align=center
|Win || 33-3 ||align=left| Juan José Días
|KO || 4 (12) ||  || align=left|
|align=left|
|- align=center
|Loss || 32-3 ||align=left| Willie Nelson
|UD || 10 (10) ||  || align=left|
|align=left|
|- align=center
|Win || 32-2 ||align=left| Joaquim Carneiro
|RTD || 8 (12) ||  || align=left|
|align=left|
|- align=center
|Win || 31-2 ||align=left| Samir Santos Barbosa
|TKO || 11 (12) ||  || align=left|
|align=left|
|- align=center
|Win || 30-2 ||align=left| Carlos Wilfredo Vilches
|UD || 12 (12) ||  || align=left|
|align=left|
|- align=center
|Win || 29-2 ||align=left| Uilian Santana Barauna
|KO || 2 (8) ||  || align=left|
|align=left|
|- align=center
|Win || 28-2 ||align=left| Mariano Andrés Carranza
|UD || 8 (8) ||  || align=left|
|align=left|
|- align=center
|Win || 27-2 ||align=left| Elvio Matias Figueroa
|TKO || 5 (6) ||  || align=left|
|align=left|
|- align=center
|Loss || 26-2 ||align=left| Canelo Álvarez
|TKO || 6 (0:32) ||  || align=left|
|align=left|
|- align=center
|Win || 26-1 ||align=left| Carlos Velásquez
|UD || 10 (10) ||  || align=left|
|align=left|
|- align=center
|Win || 25-1 || align=left| Miro Dicky
|TKO || 3 (1:08) ||  || align=left|
|align=left|
|- align=center
|Win || 24-1 || align=left| Marcos Muñoz
|TKO || 1 (0:14) ||  || align=left|
|align=left|
|- align=center
|Loss || 23-1 || align=left| Julio César Chávez Jr.
|UD || 10 (10) ||  || align=left|
|align=left|
|- align=center
|Win || 23-0 || align=left| Florin Bogdan
|UD || 6 (6) ||  || align=left|
|align=left|
|- align=center
|Win || 22-0 || align=left| Jorge Ariel Isa
|TKO || 4 (8) ||  || align=left|
|align=left|
|- align=center
|Win || 21-0 || align=left| Alejandro Gustavo Falliga
|MD || 10 (10) ||  || align=left|
|align=left|
|- align=center
|Win || 20-0 || align=left| Cristian Ricardo Rizzo
|UD || 8 (8) ||  || align=left|
|align=left|
|- align=center
|Win || 19-0 || align=left| Américo Rodolfo Sagania
|UD || 12 (12) ||  || align=left|
|align=left|
|- align=center
|Win || 18-0 || align=left| Adrian Marcelo Nieva
|KO || 3 (12) ||  || align=left|
|align=left|
|- align=center
|Win || 17-0 || align=left| Jorge Ariel Isa
|TKO || 6 (8) ||  || align=left|
|align=left|
|- align=center
|Win || 16-0 || align=left| Cristian Ricardo Rizzo
|UD || 8 (8) ||  || align=left|
|align=left|
|- align=center
|Win || 15-0 || align=left| Ramón Argentino Guidetti
|RTD || 4 (8) ||  || align=left|
|align=left|
|- align=center
|Win || 14-0 || align=left| Cristian Ricardo Rizzo
|UD || 6 (6) ||  || align=left|
|align=left|
|- align=center
|Win || 13-0 || align=left| Wálter Acuna
|UD || 6 (6) ||  || align=left|
|align=left|
|- align=center
|Win || 12-0 || align=left| Ariel Oscar Pieroni
|UD || 6 (6) ||  || align=left|
|align=left|
|- align=center
|Win || 11-0 || align=left| Diego Ariel Álvarez
|UD || 6 (6) ||  || align=left|
|align=left|
|- align=center
|Win || 10-0 || align=left| Adolfo Dionisio Rios
|RTD || 3 (6) ||  || align=left|
|align=left|
|- align=center
|Win || 9-0 || align=left| Diego Ariel Álvarez
|TKO || 3 (6) ||  || align=left|
|align=left|
|- align=center
|Win || 8-0 || align=left| Alberto Daniel Medina
|KO || 1 (6) ||  || align=left|
|align=left|
|- align=center
|Win || 7-0 || align=left| Nicolas Perillo
|UD || 4 (4) ||  || align=left|
|align=left|
|- align=center
|Win || 6-0 || align=left| Fabio Carlos Vives
|TKO || 1 (4) ||  || align=left|
|align=left|
|- align=center
|Win || 5-0 || align=left| Walter Acuna
|UD || 4 (4) ||  || align=left|
|align=left|
|- align=center
|Win || 4-0 || align=left| Walter Vazquez
|TKO || 1 (4) ||  || align=left|
|align=left|
|- align=center
|Win || 3-0 || align=left| Jorge Raul Campos
|UD || 4 (4) ||  || align=left|
|align=left|
|- align=center
|Win || 2-0 || align=left| Jose Enrique Gomez
|UD || 4 (4) ||  || align=left|
|align=left|
|- align=center
|Win || 1-0 || align=left| Daniel Alejandro Vazquez
|KO || 2 (4) ||  || align=left|
|align=left|
|- align=center

References

External links
 

Sportspeople from La Plata
Middleweight boxers
Light-middleweight boxers
Welterweight boxers
1984 births
Living people
Argentine male boxers